The England national badminton team represents England in international badminton team competitions and is controlled by Badminton England, the governing body for badminton in England. The English team is ranked 13 on the world ranking and has had many appearances in international team events.

England were runners-up at the 1963 and the 1984 Uber Cup. They've also been semifinalists 4 times at the Uber Cup. The men's team had two semifinal finishes at the 1982 and 1984 edition of the Thomas Cup. England only finished in the final four once in the Sudirman Cup which was in 2007.

Next to Denmark, England is one of the dominant badminton nations in Europe, having won the European Mixed Team Badminton Championships five times and having many podium finishes at the European Men's and Women's Team Badminton Championships.

Summer Olympic Games

List of medalists

Participation in BWF competitions

Thomas Cup

Uber Cup

Sudirman Cup
{| class="wikitable"
|-
! Year !! Result
|-
|1989 || 6th − Group 1 relegated
|-
|1991 || 7th − Group 2 promoted
|-
|style="border: 3px solid red"|1993 || 5th − Group 1
|-
|1995 || 5th − Group 1
|-
|1997 || 6th − Group 1 relegated
|-
|1999 || 7th − Group 2 promoted
|-
|2001 || 5th − Group 1
|-
|2003 || 5th − Group 1
|-
|2005 || 5th − Group 1
|-
|2007 ||  Semi-finalist
|-
|2009 || 6th − Group 1
|-
|2011 || 9th − Group 1
|-
|2015 || 9th − Group 1
|-
|2019 || 9th − Group 1
|-
|2021 || 9th − Group stage
|-
|2023 || Qualified
|}**Red border color indicates tournament was held on home soil.Participation in European Team Badminton Championships

Men's Team

Women's Team

Mixed Team**Red border color indicates tournament was held on home soil.''

Participation in European Junior Team Badminton Championships
Mixed Team

Current squad 

Male players
Toby Penty
Johnnie Torjussen
Ethan Rose
Ben Lane
Sean Vendy
Marcus Ellis
Chris Langridge
Ethan van Leeuwen
Matthew Clare
Steven Stallwood
Callum Hemming

Female players
Abigail Holden
Freya Patel-Redfearn
Estelle van Leeuwen
Chloe Birch
Lauren Smith
Jessica Hopton
Jessica Pugh

References

Badminton
National badminton teams
Badminton in England